Kamil Rustam is an American guitarist, composer, arranger, songwriter and producer whose musical career has made known as a prolific musician in many different styles.

Rustam was born in Amsterdam, the Netherlands, and moved at an early age to Paris, France where he worked extensively for most of the top pop French artists, earning the 1985 "Les Victoires de la Musique" for Producer of the Year with his fellow producing partners Manu Katché and Gabriel Yared. He was also nominated as Best Studio Musician at the 1986 and 1987 "Les Victoires de la Musique". 
In 1996 He moved to Los Angeles where he has been busy working in the American entertainment industry. In 2021 he joins the house band of the French Edition of The Voice The Voice (French TV series) and divide his time between the U.S. and France.

Early life
Growing up, Kamil Rustam had always been listening to the sounds of the guitar; his father, a student of Alexandre Lagoya and Ida Presti, would always play at home . But it was only when he discovered bands like The Rolling Stones, The Beatles, Pink Floyd and Jimi Hendrix that he decided he wanted to become a guitar player. At seven years old, he enrolled in the "Conservatoire municipal du 14eme arrondissement" and studied classical guitar for 10 years while playing modern rock music with local bands.

Career

Session musician
Kamil Rustam made himself famous for being able to play whatever style required and quickly became one of the most sought-after session guitarists in France in the 1980s and 1990s, earning him 2 nominations for Best Session Musician at the 1986 and 1987 "Les Victoires De La Musique".

Producing / arranging career
Kamil Rustam started his producing career when schoolmate Patrick Bruel asked him in 1984 to produce his first single "Marre de cette nana la" which sold over a million copies. He then produced numerous albums for best-selling French artists like Florent Pagny, Patricia Kaas and Phil Barney, and eventually got awarded Best Producer at the 1985 "Les Victoires De La Musique" for Michel Jonasz's album Unis Vers L'Uni.

Band Preface

From 1985 to 1988 Kamil Rustam was full-time member of the band Preface. The band included Manu Katché on drums and lead vocal.

Cosmopolitain 

Kamil Rustam released his debut album, Cosmopolitain, on October 20, 2017.  The album contains instrumental compositions written in collaboration with keyboardist Arnaud Dunoyer, as well as an updated arrangement of Squeeze's 1981 hit song 'Tempted'.  The album mostly maintains its sound, style and structures within a jazz fusion vein, yet Rustam exhibits his vast knowledge of various musical genres throughout.
Contributors to the album include notable session musicians such as keyboardist Randy Kerber, acoustic bassists Mike Valerio, Laurent Vernerey and Tim Lefebvre, electric bassists Hadrien Feraud and Richard Bona, plus world renowned drummers Manu Katche, Vinnie Colaiuta and Peter Erskine.  The album also includes guest appearances by soloists such as Bob Reynolds on sax, Mike Cottone on trumpet, Marc Berthoumieux on accordion and Philippe Saisse on vibraphone.

Rustam had previously recorded with legendary saxophonist Michael Brecker back in 1997 and the track 'New Amsterdam' had been rerecorded around Brecker's inspired and melodic soloing, ten years after his untimely passing.

The lead track 'Sand Dunes' had been made available in video form prior to the official release and has accumulated over one hundred thousand views since April 2017.

Artists collaboration 
List of Artists Kamil Rustam has recorded written or performed with:
Matt Pokora
CeCe Winans
Ruben Studdard
Gabriel Yared
H.B. Barnum
B.B. King
Michael Brecker
Yael Naïm
Charles Aznavour
Zazie
Johnny Hallyday
Patrick Bruel
Serge Gainsbourg
Orchestral Manoeuvres in the Dark
Michel Berger
Jean-Jacques Goldman
Michel Jonasz
Romano Musumarra
Maurane
Manu Katché
Michael Bland
MC Solaar
David Foster
Gabrial McNair
Guy Roche
Shy'm
Cory Rooney
Pino Palladino
David Hallyday
Humberto Gatica
Patricia Kaas
Lââm
Bonnie Tyler
Ben Vereen
Florent Pagny
Francis Cabrel
Celine Dion
Jennifer Lopez
Amel Bent
Barbra Streisand
Peter Gabriel
Alejandro Sanz
Shaggy
Christophe Maé
Charlotte Church
Josh Groban
Toni Braxton
Enrique Iglesias
Cher
Merwan Rim
Nolwenn Leroy
Vince Gill
Leslie (singer)
Youssou N'Dour
Kelly Clarkson
Bruce Willis
Snoop Dogg
Vitaa
Anastacia
Chrissie Hynde
Sinéad O'Connor
Jessica Simpson
Aaron Neville
France Gall
James Ingram
En Vogue
Oleta Adams
Vanessa Paradis
Chimène Badi
Francis Cabrel
Deniece Williams
Stephanie Mills
Peabo Bryson
Jeffrey Osborne
Stevie Wonder & John Mayer

Music and performances for films 
List includes songs and soundtrack
1988: Preuve d'amour 
1998: Black Mic Mac 2 
1995: Les Truffes :fr:Les Truffes
1997: La vérité si je mens 
1998: Taxi
1999: The Bone Collector2000: Rugrats In Paris 
2000: Under Suspicion
2002: The Wild Thornberry's Movie
2003: Rugrats Go Wild2006: Blood Diamond
2007: The Neighbor 
2008: Dark Streets 
2009: The Ministers 
2010: Lullaby for pi 
2012: Clash 
2020: Le Lion 
2020: Divorce Club 
2020: C'est Magnifique 
2020: Call Of Duty Mobile Season 6''

Awards 
Best Producer (winner): 1985 "Les Victoires De La Musique"
Best Session Musician (nominee): 1986 "Les Victoires De La Musique"
Best Session Musician (nominee): 1987 "Les Victoires De La Musique"

External links
 Official website
 Kamil Rustam on FaceBook
 Kamil Rustam on YouTube
 [ Kamil Rustam on All Music]
 Kamil Rustam on Discogs

1972 births
Living people
Musicians from Amsterdam
American session musicians
French film score composers
French male film score composers
French musicians
French songwriters
Male songwriters